West of Tombstone is an American Western B-movie film directed by Howard Bretherton and starring Charles Starrett.

Plot 
Marshal Steve Langdon hears a rumor that the legendary criminal Billy the Kid is maybe still alive. Langdon finds Billy's coffin empty and believes that the respected older citizen Wilfred Barnet is Billy the Kid. He informs Wilfred’s lovely daughter Carol about. When Barnet confesses his true identity to his daughter and says that he got a second chance by Pat Garrett to start a new life. His clerk overhears the conversation and informs his old gang and this leads to trouble. Barnet helps Marshal Langdon against the gang. They defeat the gang but Barnet is mortally wounded. Steve decides to let the old man rest in peace and reports that Billy the Kid died long ago.

Cast 
 Charles Starrett as Marshal Steve Langdon
 Russell Hayden as Lucky Barnet
 Cliff Edwards as Harmony Haines
 Marcella Martin as Carol Barnet
 Gordon De Main as Wilfred Barnet
 Clancy Cooper as Dave Shurlock
 Jack Kirk as the Sheriff
 Budd Buster as Wheeler
 Tom London as Morris
 Lloyd Bridges as Martin (uncredited)

References

External links 
 “West of Tombstone” (TCM)
 “West of Tombstone (IMDb)

1942 films
Columbia Pictures films
1942 Western (genre) films
American Western (genre) films
American black-and-white films
1940s American films
1940s English-language films